The men's 5000 metres at the 2011 IPC Athletics World Championships is held at the QEII Stadium on 22, and 24–27 January

Medalists

T11

T12

T46
The Men's 5000 metres, T46 was held on January 22

T46 = single above or below elbow amputation, or equivalent impairments

Results

Final

Key:   R 125.5 = Warning by unsporting manner

Splits

T52

T54

See also
List of IPC world records in athletics

References
General
Complete Results Book from the 2011 IPC Athletics World Championships
Schedule and results, Official site of the 2011 IPC Athletics World Championships
IPC Athletics Classification Explained, Scottish Disability Sport
Specific

External links
ParalympicSport.TV on YouTube
2011 IPC Athletics World Championships: Men's 5000m T11
2011 IPC Athletics World Championships: Men's 5000m T54

5000 metres
5000 metres at the World Para Athletics Championships